Johann Karl Ferdinand von Kügelgen (6 February 1772, in Bacharach am Rhein – , in Tallinn), also known as Carl Ferdinand von Kügelgen was a landscape and history painter, a Russian court and cabinet painter in St. Petersburg, a member of the Imperial Academy of Arts in St. Petersburg, and a member of the Prussian Academy of Arts in Berlin. He is the grandfather of Sally von Kügelgen.

Life
His twin brother Gerhard von Kügelgen was active as a portrait and history painter in Dresden. In his school days in Bonn, during which he lived with his brother, he studied at the first . Ludwig van Beethoven was among his classmates. 

In 1791 he and his brother received a scholarship to Rome from the Elector of Bonn Archduke Maximilian Franz of Austria. In 1796, he travelled to Vienna with the composer Andreas Romberg and his cousin, Bernhard Romberg, then later moved to Riga. 

In 1807, he married Emilie Zoege von Manteuffel (1788-1835), the sister of Gerhard's wife, Helene. His eldest son, Konstantin von Kügelgen, was also a landscape painter.

Citations

Further reading
Karl-Ernst Linz: Die Bacharacher Malerzwillinge Gerhard und Karl von Kügelgen.Verein für die Geschichte der Stadt Bacharach und der Viertäler e.V., Bacharach 1997,  (in German)

External links
 
 Entry for Karl von Kügelgen on the Union List of Artist Names
 

1772 births
1832 deaths
People from Mainz-Bingen
Baltic-German people
Russian romantic painters
19th-century painters of historical subjects
18th-century Estonian people
19th-century Estonian painters
19th-century Estonian male artists